Frederick Allan Berry (born March 26, 1956 in Stony Plain, Alberta) is a Canadian former professional ice hockey forward, who played three games in the National Hockey League (NHL) with the Detroit Red Wings during the 1976–77 season. The rest of his career, which lasted from 1976 to 1987, was spent in various minor leagues.

Playing career
During his final year in the British Columbia Junior Hockey League he scored 60 goals and 136 points in 60 games to lead the league. The following year he moved up to the New Westminster Bruins of the Western Canada Junior Hockey League, and had 75 points in 69 games. The Bruins won the league title and advanced to the 1975 Memorial Cup where they lost to the Toronto Marlboros, the Ontario champions. Berry returned for a second season in New Westminster and scored 59 goals and 146 points. Once again the Bruins took the WCJHL title advancing to the 1976 Memorial Cup, this time losing to the Hamilton Fincups.

He was drafted in the third round, 40th overall by the Detroit Red Wings in the 1976 NHL Entry Draft. He played one season in the minors before getting called up by Detroit in the 1976–77 season, playing three games. He went on to play nine seasons in the minors after that.

After hockey
Berry and his brother Bill founded Hockey Haven, a hockey retailer in Milwaukee. For many years Berry was also associated with collegiate hockey in Wisconsin, coaching the Marquette University Warriors from 1987 to 1991. He was named head coach and general manager of the Milwaukee Power, a Tier III junior team in the North American 3 Hockey League, for the 2018–19 season.

Career statistics

Regular season and playoffs

References

External links
 
 Profile at hockeydraftcentral.com

1956 births
Living people
Canadian ice hockey centres
Detroit Red Wings draft picks
Detroit Red Wings players
Hampton Aces players
Ice hockey people from Alberta
Kalamazoo Wings (1974–2000) players
Kansas City Red Wings players
Merritt Centennials players
Milwaukee Admirals (IHL) players
New Westminster Bruins players
People from Parkland County
Toledo Goaldiggers players
Victoria Cougars (WHL) players
Winnipeg Jets (WHA) draft picks